Chernobylite is a technogenic compound, a crystalline zirconium silicate with a high (up to 10%) content of uranium as a solid solution. 

It was discovered in the corium produced in the Chernobyl disaster, a lava-like glassy material formed in the nuclear meltdown of reactor core 4. 
Chernobylite is highly radioactive due to its high uranium content and contamination by fission products.

See also
Trinitite
Elephant's foot

References

External links 
 Pictures of Chernobylite (in Spanish)
 - The Most Dangerous Object On Earth!

Chernobyl disaster
Nesosilicates
Uranium minerals